Richard Webber is a fictional surgeon on Grey's Anatomy.

Richard Webber may also refer to:

Rick Webber, fictional character on General Hospital
Richard E. Webber, Major General in the United States Air Force
E. Richard Webber (born 1942), United States federal judge
Richard Webber, animator at Aardman Animations, voice of Shirley in Shaun the Sheep
Richard Webber (demographer) demographer and software entrepreneur

See also
Richard Weber (disambiguation)